Euphemia is a sans-serif typeface for Unified Canadian Syllabics. However, it does not display the Eastern Cree syllables sha and shu properly.

Usage 
Various versions of "Euphemia" have been supplied in Windows Server 2008, Windows Vista, Windows 7 and Windows 8. OS X also supplies a version called "Euphemia UCAS".

Unicode Ranges 
Euphemia has support for the following Unicode ranges:
 Basic Latin
 Latin-1 Supplement
 Latin Extended-A
 Latin Extended-B
 Spacing Modifier Letters
 Combining Diacritical Marks
 General Punctuation
 Currency Symbols
 Letterlike Symbols
 Mathematical Operators
 Supplemental Mathematical Operators
 Miscellaneous Mathematical Symbols-A
 Miscellaneous Mathematical Symbols-B
 Unified Canadian Aboriginal Syllabics

References 

Humanist sans-serif typefaces